is a Japanese lo-fi psychedelic pop band that formed in 2014.

Biography 

Tempalay was formed in 2014, when Ryōto Ohara and Yūya Takeuchi met drummer Natsuki Fujimoto in Tokyo. The band's vocalist Ryōto Ohara, originally from Kōchi Prefecture, had moved to Saitama to pursue a career in music in 2011, and started making music with drummer Yūya Takeuchi, who he met in a bar. After forming at the Fuji Rock Festival's "Rookie a Go-Go" stage in 2015, the band released their debut extended play Instant Hawaii through P-Vine Records.

From 2015, Aaamyyy from the band Eimie began working as a live support member of the band, performing background vocals and on the synthesizer. The group released their debut album From Japan in 2016.

In June 2018, Yūya Takeuchi announced he was leaving the band due to creative differences, however staying on as a live support member for their upcoming concerts. The next month, Aaamyyy was announced as an official member of Tempalay. The band released their third album With Love from the 21 Century in June 2019, which became their most commercially successful album to date in Japan.

Tempalay has toured China and the United States, including the South by Southwest festival in 2016.

Members 
 , is the band's vocalist, guitarist and main songwriter.
 , is the band's drummer, who also performs as a soloist under the name John Natsuki. In August 2018, Fujimoto married traditional ink wash painter Chinpan.
 Aaamyyy (stylized as AAAMYYY, real name Honami Furuhara), is the band's background vocalist, synthesizer player and occasional songwriter, who also releases electronic music as a soloist. She became a permanent member of the band in July 2018.

Past members
 , is the band's former bassist from 2014 to 2018.

Discography

Studio albums

Extended plays

Singles

Promotional singles

Notes

References

External links 

 
 Official Space Shower Label Site

2014 establishments in Japan
Japanese alternative rock groups
Japanese musical trios
Japanese rock music groups
Japanese psychedelic rock music groups
Musical groups established in 2014
Musical groups from Tokyo
Psychedelic pop music groups